Łojew  is a village in the administrative district of Gmina Łochów, within Węgrów County, Masovian Voivodeship, in east-central Poland.

References

External links
 Jewish Community in Łojew on Virtual Shtetl

Villages in Węgrów County
Holocaust locations in Poland